A. A. Khan may refer to:
A. A. Khan (academic) (born 1947), Vice Chancellor of Ranchi University (India)
Aftab Ahmed Khan, Indian politician and police officer
Aziz Ahmed Khan (born 1943), Pakistan's former High Commissioner to India 2003–2006

See also
Akbar Ali Khan (disambiguation) 
Ali Akbar Khan (disambiguation)